Jordan International Air Cargo is a cargo airline based in Amman, Jordan. It was founded in 2004 and is owned and operated by the Royal Jordanian Air Force.

Fleet
The Jordan International Air Cargo fleet included the following aircraft on 14 June 2011:
2 Ilyushin Il-76MF

Controversy
In March 2013, The New York Times reported that Jordan International Air Cargo was a front organization for the Royal Jordanian Air Force and responsible for covertly flying arms to Turkey to aid Syrian rebels in the Syrian civil war.

References

External links
Official website

Airlines of Jordan
Airlines established in 2004
Cargo airlines
Jordanian companies established in 2004